The 1976 Southern Miss Golden Eagles football team was an American football team that represented the University of Southern Mississippi as an independent during the 1976 NCAA Division I football season. In their second year under head coach Bobby Collins, the team compiled a 3–8 record.

Schedule

References

Southern Miss
Southern Miss Golden Eagles football seasons
Southern Miss Golden Eagles football